MA Quddus is an Awami League politician and the former Member of Parliament of Mymensingh-29.

Career
Quddus was elected to parliament from Mymensingh-29 as an Awami League candidate in 1973.

References

Awami League politicians
Living people
1st Jatiya Sangsad members
Year of birth missing (living people)